The Canadian $20 note is one of the most common banknotes of the Canadian dollar; it is the primary banknote dispensed from Canadian automatic teller machines (ATMs). The newest version, the Frontier Series polymer note, was released to the general public on November 7, 2012, replacing the banknote from the Canadian Journey Series.

Present note
The present $20 banknote was first issued on November 7, 2012. It is a polymer-based note featuring Queen Elizabeth II on the face and the Vimy Ridge memorial on the back.  The window displays the Peace Tower.
On January 18, 2013, a Canadian botanist complained that a foreign maple leaf was used as the emblem on the polymer notes instead of the sugar maple that the country has on its national flag, along with the $50 and $100 notes.

After the death of Elizabeth II, the banknotes with her image will continue to be legal tender. It is undecided whether they will be replaced in circulation with notes bearing an image of her successor Charles III in a future redesign.

History

The Canadian 20 dollar bill is one of the denominations of Canadian currency. The first 20 dollar bill was issued in 1935, and featured a portrait of Princess Elizabeth on the front and an agricultural allegory on the back. It featured a kneeling male exhibiting the produce of the field to a female agricultural figure.

All Canadian banknotes underwent a major redesign in 1991, partially to incorporate some of the latest anti-forgery methods.  Notes continue to be improved, with another design revealed on August 25, 2004, and placed into circulation on September 29, 2004.  Notes were printed on paper composed of pure cotton at two Ottawa companies contracted for the purpose: the Canadian Bank Note Company and BA International Inc., a part of the Giesecke & Devrient GmbH group of companies.

Each note in the 1991 series is sprinkled with special green ink dots, called planchettes, that glow when exposed to ultraviolet light.  The ink can be scraped off, so worn notes tend to have fewer, if any, glowing dots.  These were replaced with more permanent ultraviolet-detected threads in the new notes, as well as an ink imprint of the coat of arms.

Canadian Journey Series

Introduced in 2004 and circulated until its replacement in 2012, the Canadian Journey Series 20-dollar note is predominantly green. The face features a portrait of Elizabeth II, Queen of Canada, the Royal Arms of Canada, and a picture of the Centre Block of the Parliament buildings. Security features visible from the face include a holographic stripe along the left side, depicting the number 20 alternated with maple leaves; a watermark of the Queen's portrait; and a broken-up number 20, which resolves itself when backlit. The back depicts artworks by Bill Reid, notably his sculptures The Raven and the First Men and Spirit of Haida Gwaii; it also has a quotation from Gabrielle Roy. The back also has a visible security feature: an interleaved metallic strip, reading 20 CAN repeatedly along its length. Yellow dots representing the EURion constellation can be found on both sides (and on all 2001 series notes). As well as textured printing, the 2004 design incorporates a special tactile feature similar to Braille dots for the blind indicating the denomination. The 2004 $20 note was awarded Bank Note of the Year by the International Bank Note Society in 2005.

As with all modern Canadian banknotes, all text is in both English and French.

Twenty-dollar view
The view of Moraine Lake in Banff National Park from the top of the moraine rockpile is one of the most photographed locations in all of Canada. That view of the mountains behind the lake in Valley of the Ten Peaks is known as the Twenty-Dollar View, as Moraine Lake is featured on the backs of the 1969 and 1979 issues of the Canadian $20 note.

References

External links

Bank of Canada's banknote site
Bank Note Series: Polymer
International Bank Note Society 2005 Bank Note of the Year

Banknotes of Canada by denomination
Twenty-base-unit banknotes
Elizabeth II